Separadi (also, Siperady) is a village and municipality in the Lankaran Rayon of Azerbaijan.  It has a population of 3,173.

References 

Populated places in Lankaran District